Oleksandr Mykolayovych Lohinov (born 23 July 1991) is a Ukrainian professional footballer who plays as a centre-back.

Career
Lohinov is a product of the various academies in Dnipro.

After playing for Ukrainian clubs in the different levels, in July 2017 he signed a half year contract with Belorusian club Isloch from the Belarusian Premier League.

Personal life
His brother Serhiy Lohinov is also a professional footballer.

References

External links
 
 
 

1991 births
Living people
Footballers from Dnipro
Ukrainian footballers
Association football defenders
FC Kryvbas Kryvyi Rih players
FC Dnipro players
FC Zhemchuzhyna Yalta players
FC Zirka Kropyvnytskyi players
FC Stal Alchevsk players
FC Kremin Kremenchuk players
NK Veres Rivne players
FC Naftovyk-Ukrnafta Okhtyrka players
FC Isloch Minsk Raion players
FC Polissya Zhytomyr players
FC VPK-Ahro Shevchenkivka players
FC Krystal Kherson players
FC Bukovyna Chernivtsi players
Ukrainian First League players
Ukrainian Second League players
Ukrainian Amateur Football Championship players
Belarusian Premier League players
Ukrainian expatriate footballers
Expatriate footballers in Belarus
Ukrainian expatriate sportspeople in Belarus